Yusheng, yee sang or yuu sahng, or Prosperity Toss, also known as lo sahng (Cantonese for 撈生 or 捞生) is a Cantonese-style raw fish salad. It usually consists of strips of raw fish (sometimes salmon), mixed with shredded vegetables and a variety of sauces and condiments, among other ingredients. There is also a vegetarian version of this dish, where the fish is replaced with soy "fish", which resembles salmon. Yusheng literally means "raw fish" but since "fish (魚)" is commonly conflated with its homophone "abundance (余)", Yúshēng (魚生) is interpreted as a homophone for Yúshēng (余升) meaning an increase in abundance. Therefore, yusheng is considered a symbol of abundance, prosperity and vigor.

The dish originated from China but modern takes of the dish existed in both Malaysia and Singapore with both countries having competitive claims over who first modified the dish to its modern version.

Today, the common form of yusheng is the qicai yusheng (七彩鱼生; "seven-coloured raw fish salad") served in local restaurants during the Chinese New Year period. Also referred to as facai yusheng (发财鱼生; "prosperity raw fish salad") or xinnian yusheng (新年鱼生; "Chinese New Year raw fish salad"). The recipe generally includes ingredients such as shredded white and green radish and carrots, ginger slices, onion slices, crushed peanuts, pomelo, pepper, essence of chicken, oil, salt, vinegar, sugar and more.

Yusheng during Chinese New Year is a cultural activity for the Chinese population in Malaysia and Singapore and recently become popular although not historically practiced in Indonesia, Thailand, Hong Kong over the last few decades.

Origins 
The Chinese China Cuisine Association mentions the tradition coming from Guangdong, China before the dishes were brought to Southeast Asia by Chinese immigration. However, the statement only mentions the tradition of having raw fish during Chinese New Year, which was served very differently from today's Yusheng.

Dispute 
The dish originated in China but modern takes of the dish existed in both Malaysia and Singapore with both countries having competitive claims over who invented or modified the dish first.

In Singapore, the claim was that the dish was modified by 4 chefs, Than Mui Kai (Tham Yu Kai, co-head chef of Lai Wah Restaurant), Lau Yoke Pui (co-head chef of Lai Wah Restaurant), Hooi Kok Wai (founder of Dragon-Phoenix Restaurant) and Sin Leong (founder of Sin Leong Restaurant) in a restaurant kitchen in Singapore. In the 1970s, the Lai Wah Restaurant located at Bendemeer started the modern-day method of serving yusheng with a pre-mixed special sauce comprising plum sauce, rice vinegar, kumquat paste and sesame oil – instead of customers mixing inconsistently-concocted sauce.

In 2012, Chris Hooi, son of Hooi Kok Wai, one of the four chefs, clarified that the four chefs never claimed they invented the dish and their modified dish only took off in Singapore in the 1960s.

In Malaysia, Malaysian newspapers claimed that Yusheng was modified from a fish noodles dish originating from Guangdong, China by Lu Zhen Ji (陆祯记), a Chinese restaurant in the city of Seremban, Malaysia.

In 2009, the Malaysian Department of National Heritage declared Yusheng, alongside other Malaysian food dishes, as an Intangible Heritage Object of Malaysia.

In 2020, a descendant of Lu Zhen Ji stated that the origin of the claim was hard to prove and meaningless to insist on an origin, ending the dispute.

Ingredients and their symbolism

When putting the yusheng on the table, New Year greetings are offered. Some of the phrases commonly used are:
 恭喜发财 / 恭喜發財 meaning "Congratulations and be wealthy"
 万事如意 / 萬事如意 meaning "May all your wishes be fulfilled"

The fish is added – its Mandarin word, "魚" (pronounced "yu") corresponds to a homophone of it "余 / 餘" meaning "abundance", thus 年年有余 / 年年有餘, "abundance through the year". Pomelo or lime (大利, da li / daai lei) is added to the fish, adding luck and auspicious value (大吉大利 , meaning "good luck and smooth sailing"). Pepper is then dashed over in the hope of attracting more money and valuables. 招财进宝 / 招財進寶  meaning "Attract wealth and treasures". Then oil is poured out, circling the ingredients and encouraging money to flow in from all directions – referring to 一本万利 / 一本萬利 , meaning "make 10,000 times of profit with your capital", and 财源广进 / 財源廣進  meaning "numerous sources of wealth".

Carrots are added indicating blessings of good luck: the first word in the compound word representing the ingredient, "红萝卜 / 紅蘿蔔", 红 / 紅 (hong / hung) has a homophone in 鸿 / 鴻 referring to 鸿运当头 / 鴻運當頭  meaning "good luck is approaching". Shredded green radish is later added symbolising eternal youth – 青春常驻 / 青春常駐 , "forever young". After which the shredded white radish is added – prosperity in business and promotion at work (风生水起 / 風生水起  – "progress at a fast pace", 步步高升  – "reaching higher level with each step").

The condiments are finally added. First, peanut crumbs are dusted on the dish, symbolising a household filled with gold and silver (金银满屋 / 金銀滿屋 , meaning "household filled with gold and silver"). Sesame seeds quickly follow symbolizing a flourishing business (生意兴隆 / 生意興隆 , meaning "prosperity for the business") Yu Sheng sauce, usually made from plum sauce, is generously drizzled over everything – a reference to 甜甜蜜蜜 , meaning "may life always be sweet" Deep-fried flour crisps in the shape of golden pillows is then added with wishes that literally the whole floor would be filled with gold (遍地黄金 / 遍地黃金 , "floor full of gold").

Modern version of the dish
The yusheng had fish served with daikon (white radish), carrots, red pepper (capsicum), turnips, red pickled ginger, sun-dried oranges, key lime leaves, coriander, chilli, jellyfish, chopped peanuts, toasted sesame seeds, Chinese shrimp crackers (or fried dried shrimp), five spice powder and other ingredients, laced with a sauce using plum sauce, rice vinegar, kumquat paste and sesame oil, for a total of 27 ingredients. Originally, the dish used raw wolf herring, although  salmon was later offered as an alternative due to said species' growing popularity with customers.

Serving

Yusheng is often served as part of a multi-dish dinner, usually as the appetizer due to its symbolism of "good luck" for the new year. Some would consume it on Renri, the seventh day of the Chinese New Year, although in practice it may be eaten on any convenient day during the Chinese New Year period (the first to the 15th day of the first lunar month).

The base ingredients are first served. The leader amongst the diners or the restaurant server proceeds to add ingredients such as the fish, the crackers and the sauces while saying "auspicious wishes" as each ingredient is added, typically related to the specific ingredient being added.

All diners at the table then stand up and proceed to toss the shredded ingredients into the air with chopsticks while saying various "auspicious wishes" out loud, or simply "lo hei, lo hei" ( pinyin: lāoqǐ, lāoqǐ meaning "scoop it up, scoop it up"). It is believed that the height of the toss reflects the height of the diners' growth in fortunes, thus diners are expected to toss enthusiastically.

See also

 Ceviche
 Hoe (dish)
 Kuai (dish)
 List of salads
 Namasu
 Sashimi

References

External links

Interactive Virtual Reality – Process of Lo Hei
Jack Tsen-Ta Lee, A Dictionary of Singlish and Singapore English – lo hei
Jack Tsen-Ta Lee, A Dictionary of Singlish and Singapore English – yusheng
A recipe for yusheng
DIY Spring Toss Yusheng recipe
How to toss Yee Sang (video)
Yusheng Ingredients Meaning

Chinese New Year foods
Raw fish salads
Salmon dishes
Singaporean cuisine
Cantonese cuisine
Articles containing video clips